Ivan Roberto Mancía Ramírez (born May 1, 1989) is a Salvadoran professional footballer who plays as a defender for Primera División club Alianza.

Honours
 Santa Tecla
 Primera División: Clausura 2015

References

External links
 

1989 births
Living people
Salvadoran footballers
El Salvador international footballers
Santa Tecla F.C. footballers
Sportspeople from San Salvador
2017 Copa Centroamericana players
2017 CONCACAF Gold Cup players
Association football defenders
2019 CONCACAF Gold Cup players